A natural hazard is a natural phenomenon that might have a negative effect on humans and other animals, or the environment. Natural hazard events can be classified into two broad categories: geophysical and biological.

An example of the distinction between a natural hazard and a disaster is that an earthquake is the hazard which caused the 1906 San Francisco earthquake disaster. Natural hazards can be provoked or affected by anthropogenic processes, e.g. land-use change, drainage and construction.

There are 18 natural hazards included in the National Risk Index of FEMA: avalanche, coastal flooding, cold wave, drought, earthquake, hail, heat wave, hurricane (tropical cyclone), ice storm, landslide, lightning, riverine flooding, strong wind, tornado, tsunami, volcanic activity, wildfire, winter weather. In addition there are also tornados and dust storms. Several of these have a higher risk of occurring now due to the effects of climate change.

Terminology

Multi-hazard analysis 
Each of the natural hazard types outlined above have very different characteristics, in terms of the spatial and temporal scales they influence, hazard frequency and return period, and measures of intensity and impact. These complexities result in "single-hazard" assessments being commonplace, where the hazard potential from one particular hazard type is constrained. In these examples, hazards are often treated as isolated or independent. An alternative is a "multi-hazard" approach which seeks to identify all possible natural hazards and their interactions or interrelationships.

Many examples exist of one natural hazard triggering or increasing the probability of one or more other natural hazards. For example, an earthquake may trigger landslides, whereas a wildfire may increase the probability of landslides being generated in the future.  A detailed review of such interactions across 21 natural hazards identified 90 possible interactions, of varying likelihood and spatial importance.  There may also be interactions between these natural hazards and anthropic processes.  For example, groundwater abstraction may trigger groundwater-related subsidence.

Effective hazard analysis in any given area (e.g., for the purposes of disaster risk reduction) should ideally include an examination of all relevant hazards and their interactions. To be of most use for risk reduction, hazard analysis should be extended to risk assessment wherein the vulnerability of the built environment to each of the hazards is taken into account. This step is well developed for seismic risk, where the possible effect of future earthquakes on structures and infrastructure is assessed, as well as for risk from extreme wind and to a lesser extent flood risk. For other types of natural hazard the calculation of risk is more challenging, principally because of the lack of functions linking the intensity of a hazard and the probability of different levels of damage (fragility curves).  ThinkHazard! is an online tool that provides an overview of the hazards from eight natural hazards (river floods, earthquakes, water scarcity, cyclones, coastal floods, tsunamis, volcanoes and landslides) developed by the Global Facility for Disaster Reduction and Recovery in partnership with other institutions.

Geological hazards

Avalanche
An avalanche occurs when a large snow (or rock) mass slides down a mountainside. An avalanche is an example of a gravity current consisting of granular material. In an avalanche, much material or mixtures of different types of material fall or slide rapidly under the force of gravity. Avalanches are often classified by the size or severity of consequences resulting from the event.

Earthquake

Seismic waves at the Earth's surface, earthquakes may manifest with a shaking or displacement of the ground; when the earthquake occurs on the seafloor, the resulting displacement of ocean or sea water can sometimes result in a tsunami. Most of the world's earthquakes (90%, and 81% of the largest) take place in the 40,000-km-long, horseshoe-shaped zone called the circum-Pacific seismic belt, also known as the Pacific Ring of Fire, which for the most part bounds the Pacific Plate. Many earthquakes happen each day, few of which are large enough to cause significant damage.

Coastal erosion

Coastal erosion is a physical process by which shorelines in coastal areas around the world shift and change, primarily in response to waves and currents that can be influenced by tides and storm surge. Coastal erosion can result from long-term processes (see also beach evolution) as well as from episodic events such as tropical cyclones or other severe storm events.

Lahar
A lahar is a type of natural event closely related to a volcanic eruption, and involves a large amount of material originating from an eruption of a glaciated volcano, including mud from the melted ice, rock, and ash sliding down the side of the volcano at a rapid pace. These flows can destroy entire towns in seconds and kill thousands of people, and form flood basalt.
This is based on natural events.

Landslide
A landslide is a mass displacement of sediment, usually down a slope. It can be caused by pressure pulling natural objects down a declining hill. It can happen due to deforestation on hilly areas during the construction of roads.

Sinkhole
A sinkhole is a localized depression in the surface topography, usually caused by the collapse of a subterranean structure such as a cave. Although rare, large sinkholes that develop suddenly in populated areas can lead to the collapse of buildings and other structures.

Volcanic eruption

A volcanic eruption is the point in which a volcano is active and releases its power, and the eruptions come in many forms. They range from daily small eruptions which occur in places like Kilauea in Hawaii, to the megacolossal eruption supervolcanic event at Lake Toba which reduced the human population to 10,000 or even 1,000 breeding pairs, creating a bottleneck in human evolution. Some eruptions form pyroclastic flows, which are high-temperature clouds of ash and steam that can travel down mountainsides at speeds exceeding that of an airliner.

Meteorological or climate hazards

Blizzard
A blizzard is a severe winter storm with icy and windy conditions characterized by low temperature, strong wind and heavy snow.

Drought
A drought is a period of below-average precipitation in a given region, resulting in prolonged shortages in the water supply, whether atmospheric, surface water or ground water. Scientists warn that global warming and  climate change may result in more extensive droughts in coming years. These extensive droughts are likely to occur within the African continent due to its very low precipitation levels and high temperatures.

Hailstorm
A hailstorm is a natural hazard where a thunderstorm produces numerous hailstones which damage the location in which they fall. Hailstorms can be especially devastating to farm fields, ruining crops and damaging equipment.

Heat wave
A heat wave is a hazard characterized by heat which is considered extreme and unusual in the area in which it occurs. Heat waves are rare and require specific combinations of weather events to take place, and may include temperature inversions, katabatic winds, or other phenomena. There is potential for longer-term events causing global warming, including stadial events (the opposite to glacial "ice age" events), or through human-induced climatic warming.

Cyclonic storm
Cyclone is a large scale air mass that rotates around a strong center of low atmospheric pressure.

Hurricane, tropical cyclone, and typhoon are different names for the cyclonic storm system that forms over the oceans. It is caused by evaporated water that comes off of the ocean and becomes a storm. The Coriolis effect causes the storms to spin.. Hurricane is used for these phenomena in the Atlantic and eastern Pacific Oceans, tropical cyclone in the Indian, and typhoon in the western Pacific.

Ice storm
An ice storm is a particular weather event in which precipitation falls as ice, due to atmosphere conditions. It causes damage.

Tornado
A tornado is a natural disaster resulting from a thunderstorm. Tornadoes can occur one at a time, or can occur in large tornado outbreaks associated with supercells or in other large areas of thunderstorm development. Waterspouts are tornadoes occurring over tropical waters in light rain conditions.

Climate change

Climate change can increase or decrease weather hazards, and also directly endanger property due to sea level rise and biological organisms due to habitat destruction.

Geomagnetic storm

Geomagnetic storms can disrupt or damage technological infrastructure, and disorient species with magnetoception.

Wildfire 
Wildfire is a fire that burns in an uncontrolled and unplanned manner. Wildfires can result from natural occurrences such as lightning strikes or from human activity. These occur without any warning.

Hydrological hazards

Floods 
A flood results from an overflow of water beyond its normal confines of a body of water such as a lake, or the accumulation of water over land areas.

Biological hazards

Disease
Disease is a natural hazard that can be enhanced by human factors such as urbanization or poor sanitation. infectious diseases caused infection affecting multiple people can be termed an outbreak or epidemic.

See also
 Act of God
 Civil defense
 Disaster relief
 Disaster risk reduction
 Emergency management
 Global catastrophic risk
 List of environmental disasters
 Social vulnerability
 Standardized Natural Hazards Disclosure Statement
 Ten Threats identified by the United Nations

References

External links

 Natural hazard research from Bushfire and Natural Hazards CRC
 Natural Hazards of the U.S. Geological Survey

 
Disasters